The 9th Annual GMA Dove Awards were held on 1977 recognizing accomplishments of musicians for the year 1976. The show was held in Nashville, Tennessee.

External links
 

GMA Dove Awards
1977 music awards
1977 in American music
1977 in Tennessee
GMA